Socialist Action Party may refer to:

 Arab Socialist Action Party, Saudi Arabia
 Arab Socialist Action Party – Arabian Peninsula, Saudi Arabia
 Liberal Socialist Action Party, Italy
 National Socialist Action Party, Britain
 Sardinian Socialist Action Party, Sardinia
 Senegalese Party of Socialist Action, Senegal
 Socialist Action Party (Spain)

See also
 Socialist Action (disambiguation)
 Socialist Party (disambiguation)